"Your Smiling Face" is a hit single by singer James Taylor. First available on the album JT, and released as the album's sophomore single in September 1977, "Your Smiling Face" peaked at number 11 in Cash Box magazine and at 20 on the Billboard Hot 100 near year's end. It reached number 11 on the RPM Top Singles chart in Canada. On Billboard's Adult Contemporary chart, it reached number 6.

Background
Lines like "Isn't it amazing a man like me can feel this way?" reflect Taylor's surprise at his newfound happiness in his relationship with Carly Simon.  Rolling Stone critic Peter Herbst described it as being "unabashedly happy". However, according to Taylor biographer Timothy White, the song was written for Taylor's and Simon's then three-year-old daughter Sally. White described the song as a "pop sonnet".

Reception
Billboard described the song as a "strong followup" to "Handy Man" and described the melody as being "upbeat" and "infectious."  Taylor described it as a "good, light-hearted pop love song".  Cash Box said that "some whimsical vocal gymnastics that add the crucial personal touch."  Record World said that it is "more energetic" than Taylor's previous single  "Handy Man" and that its tempo is "engaging." Herbst praised Taylor's vocal for being "a pretty convincing rock singer" on the song.

Live performances
"Your Smiling Face" was a fixture in Taylor's live shows, but he had to abandon it for a while because he went through a period where he had difficulty reaching the falsetto notes.

Personnel
James Taylor – lead vocals, acoustic guitar
Danny Kortchmar – electric guitar
Leland Sklar – bass
Dr. Clarence McDonald – piano
Russell Kunkel – drums
David Campbell – string arrangements, conductor

Chart performance

Weekly charts

Year-end charts

Popular culture
The song was used in the 1978 film FM, starring Michael Brandon and Eileen Brennan.  
It was parodied in the South Park episode "Fat Camp" as "The Prostitute Song."
On Sesame Street, Taylor sang a parody of the song to Oscar the Grouch titled "Whenever I See your Grouchy Face".
The trailer for Adult Swim show Smiling Friends uses the song.

References

1977 singles
James Taylor songs
Songs written by James Taylor
Song recordings produced by Peter Asher
Columbia Records singles
1977 songs